Colophon may refer to:

 Colophon (city) in ancient Greece, located in modern Turkey
 Colophon (beetle), a genus of stag beetle
 Colophon (publishing), a brief description of the manuscript or book in which it is written or printed
 The Colophon, A Book Collectors' Quarterly, published 1929–1950

See also
Rosin, also called colophony, a solid form of resin 
Grossular, also called colophonite, a mineral